11 Diagonal Street is a skyscraper in Johannesburg, South Africa. It was built in 1983 to a height of 80 metres. It is designed to look like a diamond as it reflects different views of the Central Business District from each angle of the building.

The building's architect was Helmut Jahn.

Current Use

The building is currently used by the department of Development Planning & Local Government.

References

Office buildings completed in 1984
Skyscraper office buildings in Johannesburg
Helmut Jahn buildings
20th-century architecture in South Africa